Manmadha Leelai may refer to:
 Manmadha Leelai (1976 film), an Indian Tamil-language romantic comedy film
 Manmadha Leelai (2022 film), an Indian Tamil-language adult black comedy thriller film